Dickinson Theatres was a privately-owned American movie theater chain based in Overland Park.  It operated 15 theaters with 169 screens in seven states: Arkansas, Arizona, Kansas, Missouri, Nebraska, Oklahoma, and Texas.  In October 2014, the chain was purchased by B&B Theatres.

History
In 1920, company founder Glen W. Dickinson, Sr quit the family business –a Ford dealership in Brookfield, Missouri specializing in tractors—to purchase a small two-screen theatre in a booming agricultural college town. The Dickinson Marshall Theatre in Manhattan, Kansas was christened in November 1920 as the first of many Dickinson Theatres.

After overwhelming success with his first venture in the motion picture exhibition, Dickinson soon added a second market to his circuit. The Dickinson Bowersock Theatre sprung up in a booming college town less than 2 hours away in Lawrence, Kansas.

It wasn't long after when a second Lawrence theatre was opened, and within a brief period of time, the fledgling circuit had expanded its size and scope to include theatres in Junction City, Ellsworth, Beloit, and Great Bend, Kansas. He also added a theatre in Springfield, Missouri.

By 1931, Dickinson Theatres had grown to parent 26 theatres and continued to expand. It was at that time Dickinson decided to relocate the company office to Lawrence, Kansas.

In 1946, the company branched out to introduce its first drive-in theatre. The first Dickinson drive-in opened in Pittsburg, Kansas and was followed in 1948 by the construction of the 81 Drive-In Theatre in Salina, Kansas, the Shawnee Drive-In in Shawnee, Kansas and the Leawood Drive-In Theatre in Leawood, Kansas.

Company expansion and diversification continued under the operation of Glen W. Dickinson, Jr. as theatres sprung up in Waterloo, Iowa, Quincy, Illinois, Monroe, Missouri, Noel, Missouri, Anderson, Missouri, and Branson, Missouri. Property was also purchased near a little-known town called Overland Park, Kansas, with contract and the dream to build Dickinson's finest theatre.

After more expansion, the company decided to move Dickinson's corporate headquarters to Kansas City's suburban Mission, Kansas. At that time, the small city only included a filling station, barber shop, taxi service and bicycle rental shop.

The next ten years became very important for Dickinson Theatres, as the construction of a major motor hotel complex, the Glenwood Manor Motor Hotel, began at 95th and Metcalf, just a short distance away from what would be Dickinson's "Flagship" Glenwood Theatre, already in construction. In 1966, the Glenwood Theatre opened with the Midwest Premiere of the popular movie "Is Paris Burning?"

The "new" Glenwood Theatre received instant recognition for movie theatre comfort, quality and design. Its overwhelming popularity with the public and film companies soon warranted the construction of additional screens and expansion to the complex.

The decade of the 60's also marked the passing of the company's founder, Glen W. Dickinson, Sr. in 1963. The company was passed on to Glen W. Dickinson, Jr. who would go on to run the theatre chain for the next 20 years.

One of the company's most significant milestones occurred in early 1980 when Dickinson Theatres purchased 25 screens from Mann Theatres. The acquisition increased the company's size from 46 screens to 71 screens with operation in 4 states.

Glen W. Dickinson, Jr. died in 1983, leaving the leadership of the company to Kent Dickinson, the second of three sons. The other two, Jon Scott Dickinson and Glen Wood Dickinson III assisted as vice presidents for the company.

Throughout the 80's under Kent Dickinson's administration, existing theatre properties were refurbished and updated with the latest technology. New luxurious theatre complexes were constructed over the next few years and included major multi-plexes in Kansas City, Kansas, Wichita, Kansas, Springfield, Missouri, and Columbia, Missouri.

A change in company direction occurred in October 1992 when Wood Dickinson was named president of Dickinson Theatres.

During Wood Dickinson's appointment to office, Dickinson Theatres opened its first 12-screen motion picture entertainment complex, the SouthGlen Theatre in suburban Overland Park, Kansas, as well as the new Plaza Cinema 6 facility in Leavenworth, Kansas.

1995 marked Dickinson Theatres' 75th anniversary and a year of great success. Dickinson introduced the "Crown Jewel" to the Kansas City area, opening the extraordinary WestGlen 12 Theatre in Shawnee, Kansas. Destined to become Dickinson's most luxurious movie center and model operation for excellence, the WestGlen soared expectations and later expanded to 18 screens.

With a minimum addition of 20 new screens during 1995, Dickinson Theatres was operating 168 screens in 39 locations throughout Mid-America.

In September 1999, a monumental event propelled the company in a new and exciting direction. Wood Dickinson, the last of the Dickinson family, decided the time was right to leave the theater business and start Renegade Pictures, LLC a feature film production company In his place, a young and motivated team led by John Hartley, head of purchasing for Dickinson Theatres, stepped up and took control of the company. Reviving the company mission to provide the best of family entertainment, the following years show a rebirth of the Dickinson Theatres.

In October 2011, Dickinson Theaters added National CineMedia to its network affiliates, which has started on December of that year.

In July 2012, John Hartley retired and sold the company to Ron Horton, who, at the time, was Executive Vice President of Film Buying and Marketing.

Today, Ron Horton, continues to lead the company into the digital age. The company currently operates 18 theatre locations with 210 screens across 7 states.

In October 2014, Liberty, MO-based chain B&B Theatres purchased Dickinson.  All of Dickinson's locations are expected to be re-branded under the B&B name.

Locations

Arizona
 Mesa - Gateway 12 IMAX Theatre
 Goodyear - Palm Valley 14 Theatre

Arkansas
 Little Rock - Chenal 9 IMAX Theatre

Kansas
 Emporia - Flint Hills 8 Theatre
 Olathe - Great Mall 16 Theatre
 Hutchinson - Mall 8 Hutchinson Theatre
 Overland Park - Palazzo 16 Theatre
 Shawnee - Westglen 18 Theatre
 Topeka - Dickinson Theatre
 Topeka - Kaw Theatre

Missouri
 Lee's Summit - Eastglen 16 Theatre
 Kansas City - Extreme Screen Union Station
 Kansas City - Northglen 14 Theatre

Nebraska
 Hastings - Imperial 3 Theatre

Oklahoma
 Muskogee - Arrowhead Mall 10 Theatre
 Tulsa - Starworld 20 Theatre

Texas
 Port Arthur - Central Mall 10 Theatre

References

Companies based in Overland Park, Kansas
Defunct mass media companies of the United States
Former cinemas in the United States
Economy of the Midwestern United States
Economy of the Southwestern United States
Movie theatre chains in the United States
Entertainment companies established in 1920
1920 establishments in Kansas
Mass media companies disestablished in 2014
2014 mergers and acquisitions